Karim Hafez Ramadan Seifeldin (born 12 March 1996) is an Egyptian professional footballer who plays for Pyramids and the Egyptian national team as a left-back.

Club career
Hafez made his top flight debut with Belgian club Lierse S.K. on 30 August 2014 against Waasland-Beveren in a 2–0 away defeat. On 20 September 2014, he scored his first league goal against K.V.C. Westerlo in a 6–1 away defeat. Hafez continued to play for Lierse’s senior side and was one of their star performers, scoring three goals in the Jupiler Pro League but could not save his club from relegation. Because of his excellent individual play, he was called up to the Egyptian national team by their Argentine manager Héctor Cúper and made his debut for the Pharaohs in June, coming off the bench in a 2–1 friendly win against Malawi.
 
Maged Sami, the owner of both Wadi Degla and Lierse, traveled to Athens to negotiate the transfer of Hafez to AEK Athens, and an agreement was expected to be reached over several days in which the 19-year-old Egypt left-back would join the eleven-time Greek champions on loan for a season, with the option to extend the loan for two additional seasons, according to Lierse announcement on their official website. However, the move took a negative turn because of two disagreements. First, Wadi Degla sought the option of first choice if Hafez should be sold because of an offer by another club. Second, they wanted to be paid about €500,000 if AEK were to qualify for the Champions League in the 2016–17 season. The disagreements regarding the transfer were augmented when Lierse announced the transfer on their official website before it was final, which AEK Athens did not take kindly to. The deal collapsed.

Hafez then played for the French club RC Lens on loan from Lierse.

On 29 August 2018, Hafez was loaned by Wadi Degla to the Turkish club İstanbul Başakşehir for the season.

International career
In May 2018 he was named in Egypt’s preliminary  squad for the 2018 World Cup in Russia, but he wasn't selected for the final squad.

References

External links

1996 births
Footballers from Cairo
Living people
Egyptian footballers
Egypt international footballers
Association football fullbacks
Lierse S.K. players
AC Omonia players
RC Lens players
Wadi Degla SC players
İstanbul Başakşehir F.K. players
Kasımpaşa S.K. footballers
Yeni Malatyaspor footballers
Pyramids FC players
Belgian Pro League players
Challenger Pro League players
Cypriot First Division players
Egyptian Premier League players
Ligue 2 players
Süper Lig players
2017 Africa Cup of Nations players
Egyptian expatriate footballers
Expatriate footballers in Belgium
Egyptian expatriate sportspeople in Belgium
Expatriate footballers in Cyprus
Egyptian expatriate sportspeople in Cyprus
Expatriate footballers in France
Egyptian expatriate sportspeople in France
Expatriate footballers in Turkey
Egyptian expatriate sportspeople in Turkey